Karl Müller may refer to:

Karl Müller (astronomer) (1866–1942), Austrian astronomer
Karl Müller (bryologist) (1818–1899), German bryologist
Karl Müller (inventor) (born 1952), Swiss inventor and engineer
Karl Müller (rower) (1912–?), Swiss Olympic rower
Karl H. Müller (born 1953), Austrian social scientist
Karl-Heinz Müller (born 1948), Austrian Olympic fencer
Karl Otfried Müller (1797–1840), German classical scholar and admirer of Dorians and Spartans
Karl Wilhelm Ludwig Müller (1813–1894), German classical scholar and editor of Fragmenta Historicorum Graecorum
K. Alex Müller (Karl Alexander Müller, born 1927), Swiss physicist, 1987 Nobel Prize
Karl Müller (politician, born 1884) (1884–1964), German politician

See also
Karl von Müller (1873–1923), German naval captain
Karl Mueller (rock musician) (1963–2005), U.S. rock musician
Carl Muller (1935–2019), Sri Lankan writer
Carl A. Muller (1913–1991), Canadian politician
Carl Otto Müller (1901–1970), German painter